The 1996 Ameritech Cup was a women's tennis tournament played on indoor carpet courts at the UIC Pavilion in Chicago, Illinois in the United States that was part of Tier II of the 1996 WTA Tour. It was the 25th edition of the tournament and was held from October 28 through November 3, 1996. Second-seeded Jana Novotná won the singles title.

Finals

Singles

 Jana Novotná defeated  Jennifer Capriati 6–4, 3–6, 6–1
 It was Novotná's 9th title of the year and the 75th of her career.

Doubles

 Lisa Raymond /  Rennae Stubbs defeated  Angela Lettiere /  Nana Miyagi 6–1, 6–1
 It was Raymond's 3rd title of the year and the 6th of her career. It was Stubbs' 1st title of the year and the 10th of her career.

References

External links
 Women's Tennis Association (WTA) tournament details
 International Tennis Federation (ITF) tournament edition details

Ameritech Cup
Ameritech Cup
1990s in Chicago
Ameritech Cup
Ameritech Cup
Ameritech Cup
Ameritech Cup
Ameritech Cup